Thomas Hjelm Jonasson (born 27 November 1988, in Vetlanda, Sweden) is an international motorcycle speedway rider, who ridden for the Swedish national speedway team.

Career
His introduction to British speedway in 2008 went well after he won the Premier League and the Premier Trophy with the Edinburgh Monarchs. In 2009, Jonasson continued to race for Elit Vetlanda Speedway in Sweden, Gorzów in Poland and Edinburgh.

In 2010, he rode for Swindon Robins, with short stints at Poole Pirates in 2011 and Peterborough Panthers in 2012. In May 2013, he re-signed for Poole Pirates;

In 2014, he became the champion of Sweden, winning the Swedish Individual Speedway Championship. In 2017, he signed for King's Lynn Stars.

He returned to British speedway again for the 2019 season but only raced a handful of times of Berwick Bandits in the SGB Championship 2019 and Poole in the SGB Premiership 2019.

Honours 
 Individual U-21 World Championship:
 2007 - 6th place (10 points)
 2008 - 8th place in Qualifying Round 4 (8 points)
 2009 -  Goričan - 11th place (6 pts)
 Team U-21 World Championship:
 2006 - Silver medal (8 points)
 2007 - 3rd place in Qualifying Round 1 (3 points)
 2009 -  Gorzów Wlkp. - 3rd place (11 pts)
 Individual U-19 European Championship:
 2007 - 5th place (10+1 points)
 Individual Swedish Championship:
 2006 - 10th place
 2007 - 17th place
 2008 - Bronze medal
 2009 - Bronze medal
 2010 - 4th place
 2011 - 5th place
 2012 - Bronze medal
 2013 - 5th place
 2014 - Gold medal
 2015 - 12th place
 Individual Junior Swedish Championship:
 2005 - 12th place
 2006 - Bronze medal
 2007 - 11th place
 2009 - Gold medal

Starts in Grand Prix:
 GP Scandinavia - 2010 (IX) - 8 points (1,2,2,d,3)
 GP Challenge Vojens - 2010 (VI) - 9 points (2,2,1,1,3)
 GP Scandinavia (Målilla) - 2011 (VII) - 9 points (W,1,3,3,2,0) - came to semifinal

See also 
Sweden national speedway team

References

1988 births
Living people
Swedish speedway riders
Berwick Bandits riders
Edinburgh Monarchs riders
King's Lynn Stars riders
Poole Pirates riders
Swindon Robins riders